The Eye of God is a lost 1916 American silent mystery film directed by Phillips Smalley and Lois Weber and written by Weber. It starred Tyrone Power, Sr. and Ethel Weber, Lois's sister. It was produced by Bluebird Photoplays and released by them and by Universal Film Manufacturing Company.

Cast
Tyrone Power, Sr. as Olaf
Ethel Weber as Ana
Lois Weber as Renie
Charles Gunn as Paul

References

External links

1916 films
American silent feature films
Lost American films
Universal Pictures films
Films directed by Lois Weber
American black-and-white films
American mystery films
1916 mystery films
1916 lost films
Lost mystery films
1910s American films
Silent mystery films